John Weld Peck (February 5, 1874 – August 10, 1937) was a United States district judge of the United States District Court for the Southern District of Ohio.

Education and career

Born in Wyoming, Ohio, Peck received an Artium Baccalaureus degree from Harvard University in 1896 and a Bachelor of Laws from the University of Cincinnati College of Law in 1898. He was in private practice in Cincinnati, Ohio from 1898 to 1919.

Federal judicial service

On October 30, 1919, Peck was nominated by President Woodrow Wilson to a seat on the United States District Court for the Southern District of Ohio vacated by Judge Howard Clark Hollister. Peck was confirmed by the United States Senate on November 5, 1919, and received his commission the same day. Peck served in that capacity until April 3, 1923, when he resigned.

Later career and death

After his resignation from the federal bench, Peck returned to private practice in Cincinnati until his death on August 10, 1937.

Family

Peck was the uncle and namesake of John Weld Peck II, also a United States federal judge.

References

Sources
 

1874 births
1937 deaths
Lawyers from Cincinnati
People from Wyoming, Ohio
Harvard University alumni
University of Cincinnati College of Law alumni
Judges of the United States District Court for the Southern District of Ohio
United States district court judges appointed by Woodrow Wilson
20th-century American judges
Miami University trustees
Ohio Democrats